The Thrige was a Danish automobile manufactured in Odense between 1911 and 1917 by the Thomas B. Thrige company (now T-T Electric). The company was founded in 1894 and made electric motors.

Vehicles
The first vehicles were electrically powered trucks coming from the company's background in electric motor manufacture. Car manufacture followed using 4-cylinder engines from Ballot and Daimler. The trucks moved to engines from White and Poppe, Continental and Hercules. The 1914 car used a 12 hp Ballot engine driving the rear axle through a three-speed gearbox. There was no differential on the rear axle.

Merger
In 1918, the automobile manufacturing part of the Thomas B. Thrige company merged with Anglo-Dane and JAN to form De forenede Automobilfabrikker A/S. No more cars were made, the new company manufacturing mainly buses under the Triangel brand until 1950.

References

Danish brands
Brass Era vehicles
Vehicles of Denmark
Defunct motor vehicle manufacturers of Denmark
Goods manufactured in Denmark
Cars introduced in 1911
Danish companies established in 1911